Robert Leslie may refer to:

Robert Leslie (bishop) (died 1672), Bishop of Clogher
Robert Sterritt Leslie (1875–1958), Saskatchewan politician
Robert Leslie (photographer), photographer
Robbie Leslie, disc jockey
Robert L. Leslie (1885–1987), graphic designer
Robert Burton Lesley (1891–1976), Commander of the Ceylon Defence Force, 1935–1937
Robert Frank Leslie, professor of history

See also
Robert Leslie-Carter
Leslie (name)